William Barton may refer to:

United Kingdom 
 William Barton (hymnologist) (1598–1678), English hymnologist
 William Barton (English cricketer) (1777–1825), English cricketer, played mainly for Middlesex
 Sir William Barton (British politician) (1862–1957), British Liberal Politician
 William Barton (priest), Archdeacon of Totnes, 1385–1407
 William Barton (postmaster) (c. 1796–1874), British soldier and Ceylonese public servant

United States
 Will Barton (born 1991), American basketball player
 William Barton (writer) (born 1950), U.S. science fiction writer
 William Barton (heraldist) (1754–1817), designer of the Great Seal of the United States
 William Barton (soldier) (1748–1831), American Revolutionary War, known for capturing an enemy general
 William Edward Barton (1868–1955), U.S. Representative from Missouri
 William P. C. Barton (1786–1856), American physician
 William T. Barton (born 1933), American politician

Other
 William Barton (New Zealand cricketer) (1858–1942), cricketer from New Zealand
 William Barton (musician) (born 1981), Australian Didgeridoo player
 William Hickson Barton (1917–2013), Canadian diplomat
 Sir William Pell Barton (1871–1956), member of the Indian Political Service